On 4 January 2017, an explosion took place on Bannu Road in Dera Ismail Khan. The police van was on routine patrolling when it was targeted by remote control bomb that was planted in the center of the road. According to police the bomb weighed between 5 and 7 kilograms.

Events
In the attack, 15 people including five police officers and a woman were injured. The injured police officers include constable Atta-ur-Rehman, BaqarMukhtarHussain, Asif and Akram while among other injures was the security guard of Gomal University, Muhammad Ali who was referred to Multan for medical treatment. 

The injured were shifted to hospital where one injured was stated to be in critical condition. Security forces cordoned off the area and started search operation for hunting the miscreants.

References 

Terrorist incidents in Dera Ismail Khan
Terrorist incidents in Pakistan in 2017
January 2017 crimes in Asia
January 2017 events in Pakistan